The Acme School of Stuff is a half-hour Canadian children's television show which was broadcast on TVOntario between 1 September 1988 and 1 December 1990. The Acme School of Stuff was hosted by its producer David Stringer. The show primarily consisted of theory of operation on a subject or certain item at the beginning, then a field trip to a plant in the middle and following another theory of operation on some other item or subject at the end.

Notable features included:
 A Rube Goldberg machine made from devices explained on the show, as an opening scene
 Technical facts presented in a way understandable to school age children in a conversational manner
 Breaking the fourth wall by use of camera and lighting effects, and audible comments by the TV crew

Many of the episodes have been uploaded to YouTube under the acmeschool channel.

TVO original programming
1988 Canadian television series debuts
1990 Canadian television series endings
1980s Canadian children's television series
1990s Canadian children's television series